La Mulâtresse Solitude (circa 1772 – 1802) was a historical figure and heroine in the fight against slavery on French Guadeloupe. She has been the subject of legends and a symbol of women's resistance in the struggle against slavery in the history of the island.

Biography

She was born on the island of Guadeloupe around 1772. Her mother was an enslaved woman from Africa, and her father was a sailor who raped her mother at sea when she was transported from Africa to the West Indies.

She was called "La Mulâtresse" ('Female Mulatto') because of her origin, which had some importance for her in the racial hierarchy of the society of the time: because she was noted to have pale skin and pale eyes, she was given domestic work rather than being forced to work in the fields.

She saw the abolition of slavery in 1794 and joined a Maroon community in Guadeloupe.

Napoleon Bonaparte, having come to power in late 1799, decided to reinstate slavery abolished by the Convention, and enacted the Law of 20 May 1802, reinstating slavery in the French colonies. The Guadeloupeans, having tasted freedom, put up resistance. An officer named , having organized resistance in Pointe-à-Pitre, joined his men with those of another insurgent, Louis Delgrès, a free mulatto officer.  She was among those who rallied around Louis Delgrès and fought by his side for freedom.

On May 21, 1802, General Richepance stormed the fort where refugees Delgrès, Ignace, and their men were. On May 22, before the bombing, Ignace and Delgrès exited by the postern gate of Galion. The bridge over the river Galion was to become a marking point of this fight.   Ignace, having gone on the road to Pointe-à-Pitre, died in battle. Delgrès went to Matouba, on the way to Saint-Claude. Delgrès and his companions rallied to the cry of "Live Free or Die!."

She survived the battle of May 28, 1802, but was imprisoned by the French. Because she was pregnant at the time of her imprisonment, she was not to be hanged until November 29 of the same year, one day after giving birth.

Tribute

In 2007, another statue was erected in her memory, this time in the Hauts-de-Seine in the Île-de-France region, for the celebration of the abolition of slavery and the slave trade. The statue is made of iroko, a kind of African hardwood. According to its sculptor Nicolas Alquin, it is the first memorial to all "enslaved people that resisted."

In 2008, Pascal Vallot was inspired by her life for a musical comedy.

In 2011, as part of a housing construction project, the town of Ivry-sur-Seine decided to name a new road "allée de la mulâtresse Solitude" which was inaugurated in 2014.

A street is inaugurated in her name in the town of Les Abymes in Guadeloupe: the mulatto street Solitude

The 46th class of the Nantes Regional Institute of Administration bears her name.

In 2019, Solitude is the main character in the novel Spigaoù by Frédéric Lesgrands-Terriens.

On September 26, 2020, Anne Hidalgo, Mayor of Paris, and Jacques Martial, former director of Mémorial ACTe and Paris Councillor Delegate in charge of Overseas Territories, inaugurate the “Jardin Solitude” (Solitude Garden) (north lawns of the Place of Général-Catroux - 17th district). They announced the project to eventually install her statue in this garden. This would be the first statue of a black woman in Paris - which only counts 40 historical women among the thousand or so statues in Paris.

Guadeloupe Solitude, as she is also known, is being currently considered for inclusion in the French Panthéon that celebrates the memory of distinguished French citizens.

In May 2022, the French Post released a postal stamp labelled "Solitude v.1772-1802" to commemorate Solitude.

See also
List of slaves

References

 Arlette Gautier, Les sœurs de Solitude. Femmes et esclavage aux Antilles du XVIIe au XIXe siècle, Presses universitaires de Rennes, 2010

External links

1772 births
1802 deaths
Guadeloupean slaves
Rebel slaves
Women in 19th-century warfare
Women in war in the Caribbean
18th century in Guadeloupe
18th-century slaves
18th-century rebels